= Birch Town, Virginia =

Unincorporated community in Virginia, United States

Coordinates: 37°55′13″N 75°22′07″W

Birch Town is an unincorporated community in Accomack County, Virginia, United States.
